Sofiia Yaremchuk (born 3 June 1994) is a Ukrainian-born Italian long-distance runner.

Italian citizen since January 2021.

Career
She competed in the women's half marathon at the 2018 IAAF World Half Marathon Championships held in Valencia, Spain. She finished in 71st place. In 2020, she competed in the women's half marathon at the World Athletics Half Marathon Championships held in Gdynia, Poland.

Achievements

National titles
Yaremchuk won three national championships at individual senior level.

 Italian Athletics Championships
Half marathon: 2022

Italian 10 km road Championship
10 km road: 2021, 2022

See also
Italian all-time lists - Half marathon

References

External links 
 

Living people
1994 births
Italian female long-distance runners
Ukrainian female long-distance runners
Athletics competitors of Gruppo Sportivo Esercito